Eli James Brooks (born October 14, 1998) is an American professional basketball player for the Fort Wayne Mad Ants of the NBA G League. He played college basketball for the Michigan Wolverines.

High school career
Brooks attended Spring Grove Area High School in Spring Grove, Pennsylvania, where he was coached by his father. He played AAU Basketball for the Jersey Shore Warriors. Brooks averaged 20.1 points per game as a sophomore and led YAIAA guards in rebounding. He averaged 24.7 points, 7.6 rebounds, 3.8 steals and 2.3 assists per game as a junior, leading Spring Grove to its first state tournament appearance in school history. As a senior, Brooks averaged 29.7 points, 12 rebounds, and four assists per game. He led the Rockets to a 22–9 record, helping the team to a quarterfinal berth in the PIAA Class 5-A playoffs. Brooks was named to the Class 5-A First Team All-State and was a finalist for Pennsylvania Mr. Basketball. He finished his career with 2,426 points. On July 19, 2016, Brooks committed to Michigan over offers such as defending national champion Villanova, Ohio State, N.C. State, Temple and Kansas State.

College career

Brooks started 12 games as a freshman but saw his playing time decline beginning in January 2018. He averaged 1.8 points, 1.1 rebounds and one assist per game, shooting a team-low 24.4 percent from three-point range. As a sophomore, he averaged 2.5 points, 1.2 rebounds, and 1.1 assists per game. Following his sophomore season, Brooks considered transferring due to the departure of coach John Beilein. On January 17, 2020, Brooks scored a career-high 25 points in a 90–83 loss to Iowa. On February 27, he missed a game against Wisconsin due to a nose injury suffered several days prior. As a junior, Brooks averaged 10.6 points, 3.7 rebounds, and two assists per game. Teammate Isaiah Livers called Brooks a "silent assassin," as he was known for leading by example. In the 202021 season, he averaged 9.5 points, 3.1 assists and 1.1 steals per game while shooting 39.6 percent from beyond the arc. His team reached the Elite Eight in the NCAA tournament. During the tournament, he was undecided on whether to come back for a fifth season or not due to the NCAA allowing seniors a one-time exemption to eligibility rules. Eventually, he decided to come back and play for one more season. Brooks was named Honorable Mention All-Big Ten by the media during his fifth season. With the COVID-19 exception, Brooks was able to play a fifth year and finished his career with a school record 158 games played. Brooks surpassed Simpson (146) for the record.

Professional career

Fort Wayne Mad Ants (2022–present)
On June 24, 2022, Brooks signed an exhibit-10 contract with the Indiana Pacers of the NBA. 

On October 24, 2022, Brooks joined the Fort Wayne Mad Ants training camp roster.

Career statistics

College

|-
| style="text-align:left;"| 2017–18
| style="text-align:left;"| Michigan
| 31 || 12 || 10.0 || .302 || .244 || .615 || 1.1 || 1.0 || .4 || .1 || 1.8
|-
| style="text-align:left;"| 2018–19
| style="text-align:left;"| Michigan
| 37 || 0 || 12.9 || .378 || .292 || .750 || 1.2 || 1.1 || .3 || .1 || 2.5
|-
| style="text-align:left;"| 2019–20
| style="text-align:left;"| Michigan
| 30 || 30 || 32.0 || .410 || .364 || .729 || 3.7 || 2.0 || .8 || .2 || 10.6
|-
| style="text-align:left;"| 2020–21
| style="text-align:left;"| Michigan
| 27 || 27 || 31.1 || .426 || .396 || .909 || 3.1 || 3.1 || 1.1 || .2 || 9.5
|- 
| style="text-align:left;"| 2021–22
| style="text-align:left;"| Michigan
| 34 || 34 || 36.0 || .444 || .394 || .877 || 3.7 || 2.9 || 1.2 || .1 || 12.8
|- class="sortbottom"
| style="text-align:center;" colspan="2"| Career
| 159 || 103 || 24.0 || .415 || .362 || .826 || 2.5 || 2.0 || .7 || .1 || 7.3

Personal life
Brooks is the son of Kelly and James Brooks. He has a tattoo of Buddha on his left shoulder, as he studied Buddhism and practices meditation.

See also
List of NCAA Division I men's basketball career games played leaders

References

External links
Michigan Wolverines bio

1998 births
Living people
American men's basketball players
Basketball players from Pennsylvania
Fort Wayne Mad Ants players
Michigan Wolverines men's basketball players
Point guards
People from York County, Pennsylvania